Rebecca Spence is an American actress from Chicago, Illinois. She is known for playing small roles in films like Public Enemies and Contagion and had a lead role in 2010 science fiction film Earthling. She has also appeared in television commercials for Liberty Mutual Insurance.

Biography
Spence attended Hendrix College for her undergraduate degree and studied art at the Steppenwolf Theatre Company in Chicago.

Filmography

Television

References

External links

American film actresses
Living people
21st-century American actresses
American television actresses
Actresses from Chicago
Hendrix College alumni
1976 births